Fr. Caseys GAA Club is an Irish Gaelic Athletic Association club based in Abbeyfeale on the border of Kerry and Limerick.  Gaelic football is the club's main sport.

Established in 1884 by Father William Casey, Fr. Caseys GAA Club has been one of the most successful clubs in the history of Limerick Gaelic Games. Fr. Caseys GAA Club have won the Limerick Senior Football Championship on 8 occasions and contributed many players to the Limerick county teams over the years. In addition to their Senior triumphs Fr. Caseys have also enjoyed numerous Intermediate, Junior, U21, Minor and Underage successes during their history.

Rugby internationals Phil Danaher and Séamus Dennison both played football for the club.

Father Casey's most recent Limerick senior title came in 2006, when the team defeated St. Senan's by two points in the final at the Gaelic Grounds.

Fr. William Casey
Fr. William Casey was born in 1840 in the parish of Kilbehenny/Angelsborough,
Co. Limerick. Ordained as a priest in 1868, Fr. Casey was appointed permanently as a curate to Abbeyfeale on November 18, 1871. Fr. Casey was later appointed parish priest of Abbeyfeale, a position he held until his death in 1907. As a follower of Michael Davitt, Fr. Casey became a leader in Abbeyfeale and its surrounding areas in the land league and the fight against landlordism. In addition to forming the GAA Club, Fr. Casey was also responsible for organising the building of a local community hall and forming a brass and reed band. Between 1904 and 1906 Fr. Casey was appointed chairman of the Limerick County Board.

Achievements
 Limerick Senior Football Championship Winners (8) 1914, 1915, 1932, 1941, 1942, 1947, 2000, 2006
 Limerick Under-21 Football Championship Winners (3) 2009, 2010, 2011

Grounds
Fr. Caseys GAA Grounds & Pavilion are situated on the Kerry side of the River Feale on the outskirts of Abbeyfeale.

References

External links
 Official Fr. Caseys GAA Club website

Gaelic games clubs in County Limerick
Gaelic football clubs in County Limerick